Rashidabad (also Romanized as Rashīdābād) is a village in Takht-e Jolgeh Rural District, in the Central District of Firuzeh County, Razavi Khorasan Province, Iran. At the 2006 census, its population was 537, in 161 families.

References 

Populated places in Firuzeh County